Secret Valley is a valley in the U.S. state of Nevada.

According to tradition, Secret Valley was named for the "secret" route pioneers took through it in order to hide from Indians.

References

Valleys of Elko County, Nevada